Marsili is an Italian surname. Notable people with the surname include:

Luigi Ferdinando Marsili (1658 – 1730), Italian soldier and naturalist
Massimiliano Marsili (born 1987), Italian footballer
Pere Marsili, Dominican friar, chronicler, translator, and royal ambassador
Sante Marsili (born 1950), Italian water polo player

Italian-language surnames